Hotea curculionoides is a species of shield-backed bugs belonging to the family Scutelleridae.

Subspecies
 Hotea curculionoides curculionoides (Herrich-Schäffer, 1836) 
 Hotea curculionoides occidentalis Hoberlandt, 1997

Distribution
This species is present in India and Southeastern Asia.

References

Scutelleridae
Hemiptera of Asia
Insects described in 1836